Winters may refer to:

 Winters (name), a surname
 Winters, California, a town in California, U.S.
 Winters, Texas, a town in Texas, U.S.
 Winter, a season

See also 
 Winter (disambiguation)